Charna Halpern (born June 1, 1952) is an American comedian who is co-founder of the ImprovOlympic, now known as iO. Upon iO's founding, in 1983, with partner Del Close, she began teaching Harold to many students in the Chicago theater community. Many prominent comedians performed at iO, from Neil Flynn (The Middle) to Jack McBrayer (30 Rock). Also appearing were up and coming comedic minds such as Craig Cackowski (Drunk History).

Halpern opened the iO West located in Hollywood, California, in the early 2000s. In February 2018, she made the decision to close the theater citing the reasons as the neighboring nightclub and lack of attendance.

She and Close co-authored the book Truth in Comedy: The Manual of Improvisation with editor Kim "Howard" Johnson in 1994. She published Group Improvisation in 2003 and Art by Committee in 2006.

The remaining theater in Chicago, originally located in the Wrigleyville neighborhood was forced to relocate due to neighborhood development. In 2017, the theater reopened in the Clyborn North Area across from a Whole Foods flagship store, and next to VIPs strip club.

In 2020 during a forced shutdown due to the COVID-19 pandemic and a targeted racial justice outcry, she closed the only remaining Chicago location.

Early life: college years to meeting Del Close
Halpern graduated from Southern Illinois University in 1974 with a major in English and Speech. Following graduation, she set out to find work as a teacher and eventually found herself working for a juvenile delinquency school called The House of Good Shepherd under a grant offered up by the institution. Halpern continued to work at the school for three years until her programs grant finished. Around the same time that her grant ended, she returned to her father’s newly built McDonalds in Dixon, Illinois. As an English and Speech major, she had a lot of exposure with performance in her undergraduate studies. Often finding herself doing theatrical performances as a requirement for the major. Yet, it was during her time in Dixon that she solidified her passion for improvisation. As a promotional platform for the McDonalds, Halpern’s father hired an interviewer from a local radio station to exhibit the reactions of locals in correlation to the towns first fast-food restaurant being opened. Halpern, wanting to help, jumped in as an interviewer. Not long after the interview questions began, Charna was offered a job on the radio show. She worked on the radio for a year before embarking on a separate journey to pursue live improvisation.

Halpern’s strategy to entering the improv performance space was two-fold. On one end, she attended classes at the famous Second City Player’s Workshop.  On the other side of things, Halpern had created an improv troupe called ImprovOlympic, an idea she got from a similar troupe located in Canada. The idea was to get a collection of improv troupes under the same roof and practice improvisational games. Within a year, the ImprovOlympic reached commercial acclaim. Although her business seemed to be successful, Halpern was tired playing improv games and felt that there was more to her new venture. All of this changed when she met Del Close in 1981.

Halpern first met Close at an art gallery on Halloween. Her first interaction with Del Close was not superb. At the time, she was new to the study of meditation. While going to make a first impression on Close she found him conjuring the spirits of demons, a practice that was antithetical to the transcendental practice of white lighting. She took offense to this, scolding him on the way out the door. It wasn’t until a month later that Halpern saw Close again at one of her performances. She offered him 200 dollars and some pot in return for a three-hour improvisation lesson. From that day until Closes’ death 19 years later, Close and Halpern were partners.

The iO years 
After the two met in 1981, the team worked together, on and off, hosting competitive improv tournaments under the iO brand. Two years later, in 1983, Halpern made a massive change in how the iO would operate. Instead of competition between different troupes, all troupes would work together to create a shared comedic narrative. This was a long-form improvisational style that Close had been creating over the years called the Harold. Their type of improvisation was reliant on the audience’s response to the actors. The audience would throw out a suggestion and the troupes would work cohesively to create a shared improv routine. For the first few years, Halpern and the iO were known around Chicago as a group of misfits that ran from place to place. This resulted in a sense of shared community that was often missed at already established comedy clubs such as Second City which were for performers that were already notable.

Some say that Halpern adopting Close into the iO world saved him from a long-standing battle with substance abuse. To a large extent, Halpern was the “hidden architect” behind the iO. Although Close was the main creator of the Harold it was Halpern that was in charge of making the executive decision for the iO. On one end of the relationship, Halpern offered Close a refuge by which he could pass down his passions for improvisation. Since he was an admitted drug addict who had lost his job at the acclaimed Second City in 1982 not many people welcomed him into their comedic bubble. On Halpern’s side of things, having Close be a part of the iO legitimized her theater and helped her learn more about improv as an art form.

After years of working together, Close and Halpern decided to establish the iO (originally called the ImprovOlympic) in a more permanent location in 1995 by Wrigley field. They were so successful that they opened the iO West in 1997 in Los Angeles. After Close died in 1999, Halpern was left to run the theater on her own. Although they lost one of their largest assets, Halpern continued to make major strides in producing some very notable alumni including: Amy Poehler, Tina Fey, Jack McBrayer, Neil Flynn, Adam McKay, Chris Farley, and Mike Myers. Eventually the theater rose to such acclaim that the iO became a staple stomping ground for Lorne Michaels in recruiting comedians to work for Saturday Night Live.

The iO's closing and Charna's retirement 
There were a number of factors at play when it came time for Halpern to make a decision on the iO’s future. Amidst the Covid-19 pandemic, the iO fell into a great deal of debt. According to one journalistic article the theater owed a $100,000 property tax bill which reduced the theaters income to virtually zero. Halpern claimed that when Chicago mandated all theaters to be closed due to the pandemic, she knew that the theater was doomed. On top of the insurmountable amount of debt that the theater took on, Halpern was criticized by the QBIPOC community pretty heavily . This criticism comes after a student of the iO in California claimed that she was harassed by a director.  After accusing the iO of sexual harassment, other avenues of discrimination were accused. People who have interacted with the theater, historically, had claimed instances of racism by the theater as an institution and individual racism by Halpern. Overall, Halpern has been receptive to this criticism and has suggested the implementation of a more diverse range of people associated with the theater. There was a Change.org petition started to combat racism and exclusivity in the workspace. Halpern had said in an interview that closing down the iO had nothing to do with criticism in respect to QBIPOC inclusion.

Halpern listed the building on 1501 N. Kingsbury Street, a prime real estate location in Chicago, for sale in the fall of 2020. She understands that the trademark she has built for the company is highly reputable and hopes that whoever buys the building also considers taking the brand as well as the location.

Legacy 

Halpern built the iO into a comedy enterprise. She successfully turned the iO from a small mom and pop theater into a massive operation with four theaters, beer garden, party room, a reputation for producing celebrities, and cult like following of her partner Del Close. Yet handling Covid-19 has turned into a challenge for Charna. The amount of space they have and all that has been offered through the space is now unusable. Ultimately, they’ve been forced to close down. With that said, a lot of work still has to be done to ensure that people associated with the theater are not left high and dry. One of the big things that Halpern still has to figure out is how to redeem people for advanced payments for improvisational lessons. During a non-Covid summer, the theater would be holding a thirteen-hundred-dollar intensive training session. It’s one of the theaters landmark programs. With the theater having an unexpected closure, customers are furious. Additionally, they have not been informed on how they’ll be refunded the money. Halpern’s reputation is on the line. As of now, her legacy is uncertain. On one hand people respect her for being one of the most influential people in improvisation and comedy more generally. On the other hand, she’s been accused of being a racist that has allegedly done a poor job of being transparent in refunding her clients. How she goes about handling allegations of racism at her theater as well as bringing redemption to people who have put a portion of their life savings into her theater will ultimately determine how she is remembered. 

Political issues aside, Halpern provided three undeniable and lasting legacies, the nurturing of dozens of comedic talents, the writing of Truth in Comedy, and the extending of the influential, creative life of Del Close.

Notable students 

 Stephen Colbert
 Chris Farley
 Tina Fey
 Kate Flannery
 Bill Hader
 Seth Meyers
 Mike Myers
 Amy Poehler
 Jason Sudeikis
 Vince Vaughn
 Bob Odenkirk
 Scott Adsit
 Vanessa Bayer
 Matt Besser
 Maria Blasucci
 Paul Brittain
 Kipleigh Brown
 Aidy Bryant
 Kay Cannon
 Wyatt Cenac
 Andy Dick
 Kevin Dorff
 Rachel Dratch
 Jon Favreau
 Neil Flynn
 Rich Fulcher
 Peter Gwinn
 TJ Jagodowski
 Angela Kinsey
 David Koechner
 Steve Little
 John Lutz
 Jack McBrayer
 Adam McKay
 Tim Meadows
 Susan Messing
 Jerry Minor
 Joel Murray
 Mick Napier
 Masi Oka
 David Pasquesi
 Danny Pudi
 Andy Richter
 Rick Roman
 Mitch Rouse
 Eric Stonestreet
 Cecily Strong
 Stephnie Weir
 Amber Ruffin

Bibliography 
Truth in Comedy, 1994 
Group Improvisation, 2003 
Art by Committee, 2006

References

External links
 An interview with Charna on Blackout presents: Radio
 An interview with Charna about Del Close on The Poor Choices Show

1952 births
Writers from Chicago
Living people
Comedians from Illinois